Andrei Kalitin is a former pair skater who competed for the Soviet Union. With his skating partner, Lyudmila Koblova, he won seven international medals, including gold at the 1985 Nebelhorn Trophy and bronze at the 1986 Skate America.

Competitive highlights 
With Koblova

References 

1960s births
Soviet male pair skaters
Living people
Figure skaters from Moscow